A list of the tallest skyscrapers in Algeria. Many of the structures listed are located in Oran.

This list contains completed and topped out skyscrapers located within Algeria that are over 100 m (328 ft) in height. The list is sorted by official height; where two or more structures share the same height, equal ranking is given and the structures are then listed in alphabetical order.

Tallest skyscrapers

See also 

 List of tallest structures in Algeria
 List of tallest buildings in Algeria

References 

Skyscrapers in Algeria